Eunice Thompson is a former Guernsey international lawn bowler.

Bowls career
Thompson has represented Guernsey at the Commonwealth Games, in the fours at the 1994 Commonwealth Games.

In 1993, she won the triples bronze medal with (Jean Simon and Sally Paul) at the Atlantic Bowls Championships in Florida.

References

Living people
Guernsey female bowls players
Bowls players at the 1994 Commonwealth Games
Year of birth missing (living people)